Convoy SG-6 was a supply convoy of merchant and troop ships during the Second World War. It was one of the numbered SG Convoys from  Sydney to Greenland. The convoy was split into two groups with Chatham being escorted by USCG Mojave in a formation coded SG-6F, while the remainder were with SG-6S. Convoy LN-6, which was a supply convoy from Quebec City to Goose Bay, was nearby and its escort  broke off to conduct rescue operations.

Ships in the convoy SG-6

References

Bibliography

External links
 The story of SG-6 and LN-6 at veterans.gc.ca

See also
 No. 10 Squadron RCAF

SG 6 LN 6
Naval battles of World War II involving Canada
Naval battles of World War II involving the United States